In Montreux is a live album by American jazz singer Dee Dee Bridgewater. The album was digitally recorded on July 18, 1990, at the Casino de Montreux during the Montreux Jazz Festival and released via Polydor Records.

Reception

Scott Yanow of AllMusic noted "Dee Dee Bridgewater's move to France awhile back has resulted in her having a relatively low profile in jazz. This excellent live set should help restore her reputation... Bridgewater (who is backed by a French rhythm section) is in top form, singing with swing and sensitivity." The Buffalo News review by Jeff Simon stated, "...Bridgewater has enough joy, energy and authenticity to capture the stoniest heart and heaviest foot."

Track listing

Personnel
Band
Dee Dee Bridgewater – vocals
Bert van den Brink – piano
Hein van de Geyn – bass, arrangements
André Ceccarelli – drums 

Production
Jean-Pierre Grosz – executive producer
Justin Shirley-Smith – recording 
Pierre Jacquot – recording
Bruno Lambert – mixing
Alain Frappier – art direction

References

External links 

Dee Dee Bridgewater live albums
1992 live albums
Polydor Records live albums
albums recorded at the Montreux Jazz Festival